Ahtanum View Corrections Center was Washington's convalescent hospital for convicts until the Dept. of Corrections closed the facility in 2010 due to budget cuts. It was where inmates with long-term care issues were incarcerated. These can be issues relating to age or long-term health-care needs.  Since this facility closed, the inmates were relocated to a new medical housing unit at Coyote Ridge Corrections Center in Connell, Washington, as well as other prison facilities in the state depending on the level of medical care the individual inmates required at the time of transfer.

Located in Yakima, Washington, Ahtanum View is no longer open, except for the work release next door to the closed facility.

Prisons in Washington (state)
Buildings and structures in Yakima, Washington
1997 establishments in Washington (state)
2010 disestablishments in Washington (state)